Chaoborus flavicans is a species of fly in the family Chaoboridae. It is found in the  Palearctic.

References

Chaoboridae
Diptera of Asia
Diptera of Europe
Insects described in 1830
Taxa named by Johann Wilhelm Meigen